Alexandru Neculai Pălii (born 25 February 1995) is a Romanian rugby union player. He plays in the scrum-half position for amateur SuperLiga club Baia Mare. He also plays for Romania's national team the Oaks.

References

External links

1995 births
Living people
Romanian rugby union players
Romania international rugby union players
Rugby union scrum-halves